The 1942–43 Gauliga Bayern was the tenth season of the league, one of the 29 Gauligas in Germany at the time. It was the first tier of the football league system in  Bavaria (German:Bayern) from 1933 to 1945. It was the first season of the league being sub-divided into a northern and southern division, the Gauliga Nordbayern and Gauliga Südbayern.

For TSV 1860 München it was the second of two Gauliga championships while, for 1. FC Nürnberg, it was the sixth out of seven the club would win in the era from 1933 to 1944. Both clubs qualified for the 1943 German football championship, where Nürnberg was knocked out in the first preliminary round after losing 3–1 to VfR Mannheim while TSV 1860 lost 2–0 to First Vienna in the quarter finals.

The ninth edition of the Tschammerpokal, now the DFB-Pokal, saw 1. FC Nürnberg eliminated by First Vienna in the quarter finals as the best Gauliga Bayern club.

Table

North							
The 1942–43 season saw five new clubs in the league, 1. FC Bamberg, Würzburger Kickers, VfR 07 Schweinfurt, Reichsbahn/Viktoria Aschaffenburg and Post SG Fürth.

South									
The 1942–43 season saw four new clubs in the league, LSV Straubing, TSG Augsburg, FC Bajuwaren München and VfB München.

References

Sources

External links
 Das Deutsche Fussball Archiv  Historic German league tables

1942-43
1